The Roman Catholic Diocese of Caozhou/Tsaochow/Heze is a diocese located in the city of Caozhou in the Ecclesiastical province of Jinan in China.

History
 November 12, 1934: Established as Apostolic Vicariate of Caozhoufu 曹州府 from the Apostolic Vicariate of Yanzhoufu 兖州府
 April 11, 1946: Promoted as Diocese of Caozhou 曹州 (中文)

Leadership
 Bishops of Caozhou 曹州 (Roman rite)
 Bishop Joseph Wang Dian-duo (1996 - July 27, 2004)
 Bishop Francesco Hoowaarts, S.V.D. (April 11, 1946 – March 24, 1954)
 Vicars Apostolic of Caozhoufu 曹州府 (Roman Rite)
 Bishop Francesco Hoowaarts, S.V.D. (November 12, 1934 – April 11, 1946)

References

 GCatholic.org
 Catholic Hierarchy

Roman Catholic dioceses in China
Christian organizations established in 1934
Roman Catholic dioceses and prelatures established in the 20th century